Ecotechnology is an applied science that seeks to fulfill human needs while causing minimal ecological disruption, by harnessing and manipulating natural forces to leverage their beneficial effects. Ecotechnology integrates two fields of study: the 'ecology of technics' and the 'technics of ecology,' requiring an understanding of the structures and processes of ecosystems and societies. All sustainable engineering that can reduce damage to ecosystems, adopt ecology as a fundamental basis, and ensure conservation of biodiversity and sustainable development may be considered as forms of ecotechnology.

Ecotechnology emphasizes approaching a problem from a holistic point of view. For example, remediation of rivers should not only consider one single area. Rather, the whole catchment area, which includes the upstream, middle stream and downstream sections, should be considered.

Construction can reduce its impact on nature by consulting experts on the environment.

Sustainable development requires the implementation of environmentally friendly technologies which are both efficient and adapted to local conditions. Ecotechnology allows improvement in economic performance while minimizing harm to the environment by:
 increasing the efficiency in the selection and use of materials and energy sources
 control of impacts on ecosystems
 development and permanent improvement of cleaner processes and products
 eco-marketing
 introducing environmental management systems in the production and services sectors
 development of activities for increasing awareness of the need for environmental protection and promotion of sustainable development by the general public

During Ecotechnics '95 - International Symposium on Ecological Engineering in Östersund, Sweden, the participants agreed on the definition: "Ecotechnics is defined as the method of designing future societies within ecological frames."

See also

 Afforestation
 Agroforestry
 Analog forestry
 Biomass
 Biomass (ecology)
 Buffer strip
 Collaborative innovation network
 Deforestation
 Deforestation during the Roman period
 Desertification
 Ecological engineering
 Ecological engineering methods
 Energy-efficient landscaping
 Forest farming
 Forest gardening
 Great Plains Shelterbelt
 GreenTec Awards
 Hedgerow
 Home gardens
 Human ecology
 Institute of Ecotechnics
 Macro-engineering
 Megaprojects
 Mid Sweden University
 Permaculture
 Permaforestry
 Proposed sahara forest project
 Push–pull technology
 Sand fence
 Seawater Greenhouse
 Sustainable agriculture
 Terra preta
 Thomas P. Hughes
 Wildcrafting
 Windbreak

References

Further reading

Allenby, B.R., and D.J. Richards (1994), The Greening of Industrial Ecosystems. National Academy Press, Washington, DC.
Braungart, M., and W. McDonough (2002). Cradle to Cradle: Remaking the Way We Make Things. North Point Press, .
Huesemann, Michael H., and Joyce A. Huesemann (2011). Technofix: Why Technology Won't Save Us or the Environment, Chapter 13, "The Design of Environmentally Sustainable and Appropriate Technologies", New Society Publishers, Gabriola Island, British Columbia, Canada, 464 pp.
Von Weizsacker, E.U., C. Hargroves, M.H. Smith, C. Desha, and P. Stasinopoulos (2009). Factor Five: Transforming the Global Economy through 80% Improvements in Resource Productivity, Routledge.

External links
 Ecotechnology research at Mid Sweden University, Östersund, Sweden
 The Institute of Ecotechnics, London, U.K.
 ecoTECHNOLOGY for Vehicles, Transport Canada, Ottawa, Canada
 Eco Technology Show, 11-12 June 2015, Brighton, U.K.

Environmental science